Central Plains Mandarin, or Zhongyuan Mandarin, is a variety of Mandarin Chinese spoken in the central and southern parts of Shaanxi, Henan, southwestern part of Shanxi, southern part of Gansu, far southern part of Hebei, northern Anhui, northern parts of Jiangsu, southern Xinjiang and southern Shandong.

The archaic dialect in Peking opera is a form of Zhongyuan Mandarin.

Among Hui people, Zhongyuan Mandarin is sometimes written with the Arabic alphabet, called Xiao'erjing ("Children's script").

Subdialects 

 Zheng-Kai (鄭開) region: e.g. Kaifeng (開封) dialect, Zhengzhou (鄭州) dialect
 Luo-Song (洛嵩) region: e.g. Luoyang dialect (洛陽話)
 Nan-Lu (南魯) region: e.g. Nanyang (南陽) dialect
 Luo-Xiang (漯項) region: e.g. Zhumadian (駐馬店) dialect
 Shang-Fu (商阜) region: e.g. Shangqiu (商丘) dialect, Fuyang (阜陽) dialect
 Xin-Beng (信蚌) region: e.g. Xinyang (信陽) dialect, Bengbu (蚌埠) dialect
 Yan-He (兗菏) region: e.g. Jining (濟寧) dialect
 Xu-Huai (徐淮) region: e.g. Xuzhou dialect (徐州話)
Fenhe (汾河) region: e.g. Linfen (臨汾) dialect, Wanrong (萬榮) dialect
 Guanzhong region (关中), e.g. Xi'an (西安) dialect
 Qin-Long (秦陇) region: e.g. Xining (西寧) dialect, Dunhuang (敦煌) dialect
 Longzhong (陇中) region: e.g. Tianshui (天水) dialect, Dingxi (定西) dialect
 Hezhou (河州) Region: e.g. Gangou dialect (甘溝話) (influenced by Monguor)
Nanjiang (南疆) Region: e.g. Yanqi dialect, Tulufan dialect
Dungan language, written in Cyrillic, introduced many Russian loanwords, spoken mainly in Chu Valley and Fergana Valley in Central Asia

Phonology
In Central Plains Mandarin, some phonological changes have affected certain syllables but not Standard Chinese. 

 and  have shifted to  before the vowel .

Standard Mandarin's ,  and have shifted to   before .   has shifted to   before .

See also 
Zhongyuan culture
Central Plains (China), also called "Zhongyuan"

References

Citations

Sources 

 
 
 

Mandarin Chinese
Articles containing video clips